Karori is a suburb located at the western edge of the urban area of Wellington, New Zealand, 4 km from the city centre and is one of New Zealand's most populous suburbs, with a population of  in

History

Origins 
The name Karori used to be Kaharore and is from te reo Māori. It comes from the Māori phrase 'te kaha o ngā rore' meaning 'the place of many bird snares'. Originally forested, Māori used the Karori area for hunting. It also had tracks crossing it that led to Māori pā on the west coast.

No Māori lived in the area when the first European settlers came to Karori in the 1840s, having bought the land from the New Zealand Company. The first settler in Karori, John Yule of Glasgow, cleared 20 acres of forest on his section with his younger brother Moses and advertised its sale in December 1841. By 1845, ten 100-acre sections were being taken up and sub-divided, and Karori recorded 215 inhabitants – 109 of them under the age of 14 years.

In 1845 a group of armed police from Wellington constructed a small fortified post that became known as "The Stockade" in response to fears of attacks from nearby Māori insurgents. While there were no attacks, the stockade was used for a church service and to grind grain. The stockade was located on Mr Chapman's land, about halfway along what is now Marsden Avenue.

The first mental hospital in Wellington was built in 1854. By 1871 it had 23 inmates and was run by untrained staff, which resulted in the first matron and her husband being dismissed in 1872 because of cruelty. In 1873 the asylum moved from Karori to the site of present-day Government House in central Wellington. Karori School took over the asylum site in 1875.

Frederick Mackie in his book Traveller under concern described Karori in the 1850s:

"The walk was highly romantic. The road is cut out of the sides of steep hills covered with forest. The ever-winding road, the steep declivities, the forest above and below you, and the continual murmur of streams concealed in the depths below were very pleasing, as every few yards a new scene and fresh objects were brought to view. In one spot I obtained a view of the harbour, which today was like a bright glassy lake, and beyond it were the lofty ranges of the snow-clad Rimutaka and Tararuas, partly glistening in the sun and partly shrouded in cloud."

Karori gold rush
Karori experienced a gold rush when the valley of the Upper Kaiwharawhara Stream became subject to intensive gold-mining activity between 1869 and 1873. This activity eventually led to the building of the lower Karori Dam (now part of Zealandia) in 1873. At the height of the rush, about 200 men worked the claims, driving shafts and drives up to 500 feet in length into the hills.

Growth and subdivision 
In 1888 a syndicate purchased section 34, which was the closest to town (running from present day Ponsonby Road to Cooper Street). The new owners prepared the land for sale by building roads and naming them after the members of the syndicate and their families, and by running a marketing campaign, including providing free buses from Manners Street and writing poems:
In far-famed New Zealand, the evergreen free land
Most favoured and beautiful Queen of the wave,
Where the sun ever smiling, bad weather beguiling,
Brightly shines on the face of the honest and brave.
Tho' for Europe's bold races there are plenty of places
Adapted as homes for the great and the small,
Yet, for onward progressing and bountiful blessing
There is one whose position is far before all.
So haste where kind Nature's arrayed in her glory,
To pleasant, romantic, suburban Karori.

Karori Borough, 1891–1920
Karori was a part of Hutt County from the county's establishment in 1877 to 1891 when Karori was declared a separate borough following a petition in favour of forming a borough with 123 signatories. A counter-petition garnered 41 signatories.

List of mayors of Karori Borough

Amalgamation with Wellington, 1920 
Both Wellington and Karori expanded towards each other, the two urban areas becoming gradually connected, aided by the construction of the Karori tunnel in 1901, and the Borough of Karori amalgamated with the City of Wellington in 1920.

Demographics

Karori had a population of 15,234 at the 2018 New Zealand census, an increase of 555 people (3.8%) since the 2013 census, and an increase of 1,230 people (8.8%) since the 2006 census. There were 5,361 households. There were 7,479 males and 7,755 females, giving a sex ratio of 0.96 males per female, with 3,114 people (20.4%) aged under 15 years, 2,937 (19.3%) aged 15 to 29, 7,272 (47.7%) aged 30 to 64, and 1,911 (12.5%) aged 65 or older.

Ethnicities were 76.0% European/Pākehā, 5.7% Māori, 3.4% Pacific peoples, 19.5% Asian, and 3.9% other ethnicities (totals add to more than 100% since people could identify with multiple ethnicities).

The proportion of people born overseas was 35.2%, compared with 27.1% nationally.

Although some people objected to giving their religion, 52.9% had no religion, 33.9% were Christian, 2.7% were Hindu, 1.2% were Muslim, 1.7% were Buddhist and 2.7% had other religions.

Of those at least 15 years old, 6,231 (51.4%) people had a bachelor or higher degree, and 717 (5.9%) people had no formal qualifications. The employment status of those at least 15 was that 6,549 (54.0%) people were employed full-time, 1,797 (14.8%) were part-time, and 501 (4.1%) were unemployed.

Sports teams
Waterside Karori association football club founded when Karori Swifts and Waterside (a club based in Kaiwharawhara) merged.

Karori United Tennis Club based in Karori.
Karori Amateur Athletics Club
Karori Cricket Club 
Karori Netball Club 
Karori Bowling Club

Karori Historical Society
Karori Historical Society is one of many historical societies of Aotearoa New Zealand, membership application is open to all residents and citizens of New Zealand. The activities include publishing books about the history of Karori and there are many titles listed on their website for example Karori and its People and Karori Streets 1841–1991. The book  Karori Streets was updated in 2019 and is about the European settlement of the suburb. Original authors are Will Chapman and historian Katherine (Kitty) Wood who was born in 1912. Judith Burch is the president of Karori historical society and co-author of the book, Karori and its People. The other author is Jan Heynes, also the vice president of the society. Heynes has family connections in Karori from in the early 1900s through the Kirkcaldie family.

Notable people
Katherine Mansfield (1888–1923), novelist
George Friend (1835–1898), parliamentary official
Duncan Oughton: football player
George Hudson (entomologist)
Tom Young (trade unionist)
Harold Beauchamp: chairman of the Bank of New Zealand, father to Katherine Mansfield
Daisy Platts-Mills: doctor and community leader
Colin McLeod (engineer)
Samuel Duncan Parnell: activist
Diana Mason (doctor)
Bryan Waddle: sports broadcaster
E. Mervyn Taylor: artist

Facilities

Parks and reserves
Zealandia (formerly called the Karori Wildlife Sanctuary) is an enclosed restoration project focusing on the flora and fauna that inhabited the valley before human settlement.

Karori Park, on Karori Road features a football and cricket sports ground, all-weather track, changing rooms and play area.

Ben Burn Park, on Campbell Street features a football and cricket sports ground, changing rooms, athletics, play area and artificial cricket surfaces.

Wrights Hill Reserve in southern Karori features mountain bike and walking tracks and the historic Wrights Hill Fortress with a network of tunnels and gun emplacements overlooking the valley.Makara Peak Mountain Bike Park in southern Karori has over 40 km of mountain bike and walking tracks built by the mountain biking community and is recognised as a world-class area dedicated to mountain biking.

Karori pool
Karori pool is a modern indoor swimming complex with a 25-meter heated pool, learners' pool, toddlers' pool, spa pool and a 30-meter hydro-slide. The pool was originally an outdoor facility first opened in 1936. The pool was converted to an indoor pool in 2001 and additional work in 2010 added the hydro-slide. The pool is home to the Karori Pirates swimming club.

Shopping
The centre of Karori contains a basic shopping mall with two supermarkets, a Council-operated library (containing a café), a recreation centre and other amenities.

Library 
Karori Library opened in the 1840s, operating out of the community hall at the site of the present day library on Karori Road. In November 2005, the current two-level library and café were opened. The architects were Warren and Mahoney and the building received critical acclaim receiving this review in Architecture New Zealand: "The Karori library is a box of light that shines brightly in an overcast suburb. The relationship to the street is a model for all those who design for the outer city."

Community garden 
The Karori Community Garden was founded in 2015 by Paul Stevenson. It is located at 21 Beauchamp Street, behind the Beauchamp Street Chapel.

Churches and cemeteries 

Karori Cemetery is the second-largest in New Zealand. Opened in 1891, it replaced the cemetery at Bolton Street as the main burial ground for the inhabitants of Wellington. It covers 100 acres / 40 hectares. The Small Chapel contains excellent stained glass windows designed by Wilhelmina Geddes. The cemetery contains the war graves of 267 Commonwealth service personnel of World War I and 123 of World War II, in separate plots for each war, the plots being linked by the Wellington Provincial Memorial (in the form of a marble archway) which commemorates 65 World War I and 20 World War II military personnel from the Wellington Military District who died abroad and have no known grave (most were buried at sea). Karori Cemetery "closed" in 1965 for the establishment of new burial plots, but interments in established graves continue.

Futuna Chapel, built in 1961 by the Society of Mary, was awarded New Zealand Institute of Architects Gold medal for best building in 1968. The chapel was deconsecrated in 2000 and was sold to a property developer who planned to clear the section for residential development. The building was saved when it was listed as a heritage building and is being restored by a Charitable Trust.

Other churches in Karori include:

 Karori Anglican Church
 Karori Baptist Church
 Catholic Church St Theresa
 St Anselm's Union Church
 St Ninian's Uniting
 St Mary's Anglican Church

Public transport

Until 31 October 2017, the full length of Karori Road was served by the Karori Park trolley bus route, which replaced the former tram service in 1954. For many years vehicles on this route ran as Route 12 to Courtenay Place, but are now designated as Route 2 and through-routed via the city - alternating between Miramar and Seatoun as destinations. The weekday seven-minute service is the most-frequent of all Wellington routes. Other routes serving the suburb are Route 18e which runs through Kelburn to Miramar via Massey University; Route 21 which runs up Beauchamp St and down Birdwood St, to and from Courtenay Place; peak-time Route 37 which runs the 21 route to The Terrace, then via Bowen St and Featherston St to Brandon St; peak-time Route 33 from Karori South to and from Brandon St and peak-time Route 34 which runs from Karori West to and from Brandon St - with an hourly service from Karori South just to and from Karori Mall during the day.

Electric buses were introduced on Route 2 in August 2021.

Education

School enrolment zone
Karori is within the enrolment zones for Wellington College, Wellington Girls' College, Wellington High School, St Oran's College, Karori West Normal School, and Karori Normal School.

Wellington Teachers' Training College  
Stage one of purpose built faculties to hold the Wellington Teachers' Training College were complete in 1969 on the site 26-40 Donald Street. It has a rich history with many notable New Zealanders attended and teaching there. Other names include the Wellington College of Education. This campus was the home of Victoria University of Wellington Faculty of Education briefly with some controversy until 2016 when the Faculty moved to the Kelburn campus. Construction of a retirement village on the site is underway in 2020 with the company Ryman purchasing the site in 2017.

Secondary school
Samuel Marsden Collegiate School is a composite private Anglican girls' school on Karori Road in Marsden Village. It offers classes from new entrants to Year 13. In 2014 it had a roll of 502.

Public primary schools

It was founded in 1857 and is the second-largest full primary school in New Zealand. It has an artificial turf, two playgrounds, 35 classrooms in approximately four buildings, a concrete field, and a grass field. The author Katherine Mansfield attended the school from 1895 to 1898 and there is a memorial to her at the school on a concrete field called the Katherine Mansfield field, located in front of a tree she wrote about in one of her stories.

Christian schools

Samuel Marsden Collegiate School Karori is an Anglican girls' school for Year 1 to 13 students, founded in 1878.

Preschools
There are a number of preschool education providers in Karori, including:
 Karori Playcentre 
 Marsden Preschool
 Karori Kindercare
 Donald Street Preschool
 Karori Kids Preschool
 Karori Childcare Centre
 Karori Plunket Creche
 St Mary's Early Childhood Education Centre
 Sunshine Kindergarten
 Kiwi Kids Preschool

References

Suburbs of Wellington City